Abderrahim Berriah (born 10 January 1988) is an Algerian professional handball player.

He competed for the Algerian national team at the 2015 World Men's Handball Championship in Qatar.

He also participated at the 2009, 2011 and 2013 World Championships.

References

1988 births
Living people
Algerian male handball players
People from Saïda
African Games bronze medalists for Algeria
African Games medalists in handball
Competitors at the 2018 Mediterranean Games
Competitors at the 2011 All-Africa Games
Mediterranean Games competitors for Algeria
21st-century Algerian people
20th-century Algerian people